Vanuatu competed at the 2011 Pacific Games in Nouméa, New Caledonia between August 27 and September 10, 2011. As of June 28, 2011 Vanuatu has listed 244 competitors.

Archery

Vanuatu has qualified 3 athletes.

Men
William Lago
Andrew Joe
Maxon Seru Sam

Athletics

Vanuatu has qualified 14 athletes.

Men
Kepsen Abraham
David Benjimen -  4x400m Relay
Kolson Buletare
Tony Ialu
Moses Kamut -  4x400m Relay
Abraham Kepsen
Jerry Lauto
George Vin Molisingi
Philip Nausien
Jimmy Kasile Nocklam -  4x400m Relay
Keven Paul
Arnold Mol Sorina -  800m,  4x400m Relay

Women
Daphne Nalawas
Susan Tama

Basketball

Vanuatu has qualified a women's team.  Each team can consist of a maximum of 12 athletes

Women
Leimalu Irene William
Lola Izono
Maleu Mary Aaron
Marie Kelsie Java
Meriam Simbolo
Nancy Patterson
Roselyn Francoise Willy
Ruth Daniel
Susie Taonaru Waroka
Vanessa Willy

Boxing

Vanuatu has qualified 6 athletes.

Men
Jean Leonce Nauka -  -49kg
Jules Duvu
Daniel Iata -  -60kg
Ruatu Sapa
Fred Moia -  -69kg
Daniel Ionum

Cricket

Vanuatu has qualified a team.  Each team can consist of a maximum of 15 athletes.

Men -  Team Tournament
Andrew Mansale
Trevor Langa
Simpson Hopeman Obed
Damian Smith
Lenica Natapei
Patrick Matautaava
Kenny Tari
Jelany Chilia
Niko Georges Unavalu
Eddie Mansale
Jaxies Samuel
Nalin Nipiko
Johnniel Willy Ateou
Samson Kalworai
Shem Sala

Football

Vanuatu has qualified a men's team.  Each team can consist of a maximum of 21 athletes.
 
Men
Enest Bong
Alphonse Bongnaim
Selwyn Sese Ala
Rexley Tarivuti
Georges Tabe
Kensi Tangis
Jean Robert Yelou
Seimata Chilia
Robert Tasso
Richard Garae
Michell Kaltak
Eddison Stephen
Filiamy Nikiau
Andrew Chichirua
Daniel Michel
Chikau Mansale
Ivong Wilson
Daniel Natou
Ricky Tari
Lucien Hinge
Brian Kaltack
Jean Kaltak

Judo

Vanuatu has qualified 10 athletes.

Men
Tom Willie
Joe Mahit
Loic Rudolph Kasten
Pierre Raymond Bourdet
Richard Billy
Marceau Rouvoune
Nicolas Monvoisin
Nazario Martin Fiakaifonu

Women
Veronica Tari
Amata Sialehifoga Fiakaifonu

Karate

Vanuatu has qualified 9 athletes.

Men
Tumu Lango
Petelo Perkon Peato
Arnold Peato Lasalo -  -75kg
Benjie Wotu
Stephen Tarip Manaruru -  -60kg
Trevor Naieu
Johnny Rosses Laau
Yves Louis

Women
Vamule Vassy Mata Lango

Rugby Sevens

Vanuatu has qualified a men's team.  Each team can consist of a maximum of 12 athletes.

Men
Claude Raymond
Koko Kalsal
Toara Dick Toara
Waute Chichirua
Andro Kalpukai
Antoine Sablan
Jeffrey Saurei
Steven Jacob Shem
James Kalsal
Omari Kalmet Kakokoto
Bill Vanu
Tonny Lui

Squash

Vanuatu has qualified 4 athletes.

Men
Yannick Jacobe
Pierre Henri Brunet
Kristian Henri Russet
Julien Rodolphe Lenglet

Surfing

Vanuatu has qualified 2 athletes.

Men
Benjamin Thomas Johnson
Roger Abel Kalotiti

Table Tennis

Vanuatu has qualified 9 athletes.

Men
Randy Benjamin
Yoshua Jordan Shing -  Mixed Double Tournament
Samuel Saul
Ham Frexly Lulu

Women
Anolyn Flyn Lulu -  Mixed Double Tournament,  Team Tournament
Stephanie Qwea -  Team Tournament
Tracey Lorette Mawa -  Team Tournament
Pareina Doralyne Matariki -  Team Tournament
Wai Yein Put

Taekwondo

Vanuatu has qualified 6 athletes.

Men
Paul Gibson Massing
Tari Terry
Hoems Kalfau
Holmes Kalotrip -  87kg & Over
Bruce Jonathan
Joseph Mackie

Tennis

Vanuatu has qualified 7 athletes.

Men
Aymeric Mara -  Team Tournament
Cyril Jacobe -  Single Tournament,  Double Tournament,  Team Tournament
Jerome Rovo -  Double Tournament,  Team Tournament
Gregory Jacobe -  Team Tournament
Lorenzo Pineda -  Team Tournament

Women
Lorraine Banimataku
Marie Hyacinthe Liwuslili

Volleyball

Beach Volleyball

Vanuatu has qualified a men's and women's team.  Each team can consist of a maximum of 2 members.

Men
Rio Lesines
Pierrick Lesines

Women -  Team Tournament
Miller Elwin
Linline Matauatu

Indoor Volleyball

Vanuatu has qualified a women's team.  Each team can consist of a maximum of 12 members.

Women
Serah Toto
Belinda Rarangi
Ruth Napuati
Lindie Tralikon
Joyce Joshua
Leeslyn Ler
Kavila Kalret
Leses Lyn Hilialong
Nairine Alavanua
Dolcy Melanie Kamasteia
Madeleine Natonga
Elina Meltenecknein

References

2011 in Vanuatuan sport
Nations at the 2011 Pacific Games
Vanuatu at the Pacific Games